Kitt may refer to:

Kitt (surname)
Kitt Peak, a mountain in Arizona
Kitt, Indiana, an unincorporated community
2322 Kitt Peak, asteroid
KITT (FM), a radio station (106.5 FM) licensed to serve Meridian, Texas, United States
KCHQ (FM), a radio station (100.1 FM) licensed to serve Soda Springs, Idaho, United States, which held the call sign KITT from 2004 to 2017
KITT, fictional automobiles in the Knight Rider franchise
Kitt O'Brien, American football player
Kitt Stoodley, Welsh musician

See also
 Kit (disambiguation)
 Kitts (disambiguation)
 Kitty (disambiguation)